The men's nanquan competition at the 1990 Asian Games in Beijing, China was held on 1 October at the Haidian Gymnasium.

Schedule

Results 
Only a few scores have been preserved.

References 

Men's_changquan